Lupinus kuschei, the Yukon lupine, is a species of flowering plant from the order of Fabales which can be found in Alaska and Western Canada.

Description

References

kuschei
Flora of Alaska
Flora of Western Canada
Taxa named by Alice Eastwood